VPS13A (Vacuolar protein sorting-associated protein 13A) is a protein that in humans is encoded by the VPS13A gene.

Function 

The protein encoded by this gene may control steps in the cycling of proteins through the trans-Golgi network to endosomes, lysosomes and the plasma membrane. Mutations in this gene cause the autosomal recessive disorder, chorea acanthocytosis. Alternative splicing of this gene results in multiple transcript variants.

Model organisms 

Model organisms have been used in the study of VPS13A function. A conditional knockout mouse line called Vps13atm1b(EUCOMM)Wtsi was generated at the Wellcome Trust Sanger Institute. Male and female animals underwent a standardized phenotypic screen to determine the effects of deletion. Additional screens performed:  - In-depth immunological phenotyping

References

Further reading

External links 
 GeneReviews/NCBI/NIH/UW entry on Chorea-acanthocytosis